The 1974 King's Cup finals were held from December 10 until December 20, 1974, once again in Bangkok. This was the 7th edition of the international football competition.

The tournaments was expanded from the previous edition to 8 teams. Seven of which were national teams and one clubside

The Groups
Two groups of four teams.
Winners and runner up qualifies for the semi-finals.

Fixtures and results

Group A

Playoff game was needed to determine 2nd place

Group B

Playoff needed to determine group winners

Semi-finals

3rd-place match

Final

Winner

External links
RSSSF

King's Cup
Kings Cup, 1974
Kings Cup, 1974
International association football competitions hosted by Thailand